In mathematics, Bochner's theorem (named for Salomon Bochner) characterizes the Fourier transform of a positive finite Borel measure on the real line. More generally in harmonic analysis, Bochner's theorem asserts that under Fourier transform a continuous positive-definite function on a locally compact abelian group corresponds to a finite positive measure on the Pontryagin dual group. The case of sequences was first established by Gustav Herglotz (see also the related Herglotz representation theorem.)

The theorem for locally compact abelian groups

Bochner's theorem for a locally compact abelian group G, with dual group , says the following:

Theorem For any normalized continuous positive-definite function f on G (normalization here means that f is 1 at the unit of G), there exists a unique probability measure μ on  such that

 

The Gelfand–Fourier transform is an isomorphism between the group C*-algebra C*(G) and C0(Ĝ). The theorem is essentially the dual statement for states of the two abelian C*-algebras.

The proof of the theorem passes through vector states on strongly continuous unitary representations of G (the proof in fact shows that every normalized continuous positive-definite function must be of this form). 

Given a normalized continuous positive-definite function f on G, one can construct a strongly continuous unitary representation of G in a natural way: Let F0(G) be the family of complex-valued functions on G with finite support, i.e. h(g) = 0 for all but finitely many g.  The positive-definite kernel K(g1, g2) = f(g1 − g2) induces a (possibly degenerate) inner product on F0(G). Quotiening out degeneracy and taking the completion gives a Hilbert space

 

whose typical element is an equivalence class [h]. For a fixed g in G, the "shift operator" Ug defined by (Ug)(h) (g') = h(g − g), for a representative of [h], is unitary. So the map

 

By continuity of f, it is weakly continuous, therefore strongly continuous. By construction, we have 

 

where [e] is the class of the function that is 1 on the identity of G and zero elsewhere. Chasing through the isomorphisms then gives

 

 

is a normalized continuous positive-definite function. Continuity of f follows from the dominated convergence theorem. This extends uniquely to a representation of its multiplier algebra  and therefore a strongly continuous unitary representation Ug. As above we have f given by some vector state on Ug

 

therefore positive-definite.

The two constructions are mutual inverses.

Special cases 

Bochner's theorem in the special case of the discrete group Z is often referred to as Herglotz's theorem (see  Herglotz representation theorem) and says that a function f on Z with f(0) = 1 is positive-definite if and only if there exists a probability measure μ on the circle T such that

 

Similarly, a continuous function f on R with f(0) = 1 is positive-definite if and only if there exists a probability measure μ on R such that

Applications

In statistics, Bochner's theorem can be used to describe the serial correlation of certain type of time series. A sequence of random variables  of mean 0 is a (wide-sense) stationary time series if the covariance

 

only depends on n − m. The function

 

is called the autocovariance function of the time series. By the mean zero assumption,

 

where ⟨⋅, ⋅⟩ denotes the inner product on the Hilbert space of random variables with finite second moments. It is then immediate that g is a positive-definite function on the integers . By Bochner's theorem, there exists a unique positive measure μ on [0, 1] such that 

 

This measure μ is called the spectral measure of the time series. It yields information about the "seasonal trends" of the series.

For example, let z be an m-th root of unity (with the current identification, this is 1/m ∈ [0, 1]) and f be a random variable of mean 0 and variance 1. Consider the time series . The autocovariance function is

 

Evidently, the corresponding spectral measure is the Dirac point mass centered at z. This is related to the fact that the time series repeats itself every m periods.

When g has sufficiently fast decay, the measure μ is absolutely continuous with respect to the Lebesgue measure, and its Radon–Nikodym derivative f is called the spectral density of the time series.

See also 
 Positive-definite function on a group
 Characteristic function (probability theory)

References 

 M. Reed and Barry Simon, Methods of Modern Mathematical Physics, vol. II, Academic Press, 1975.

Theorems in harmonic analysis
Theorems in measure theory
Theorems in functional analysis
Theorems in Fourier analysis
Theorems in statistics